Helen Konalchik was an All-American Girls Professional Baseball League player.

Additional information is incomplete because there are no records available at the time of the request.

In 1988 was inaugurated a permanent display at the Baseball Hall of Fame and Museum at Cooperstown, New York, that honors those who were part of the All-American Girls Professional Baseball League. Helen Konalchik, along with the rest of the girls and the league staff, is included at the display/exhibit.

Sources

All-American Girls Professional Baseball League players
Date of birth missing
Place of birth missing
Possibly living people
Year of birth missing